Bryoria subcana is a species of horsehair lichen in the family Parmeliaceae. It is found in North America and Europe.

References

subcana
Lichen species
Lichens described in 1892
Lichens of Europe
Lichens of North America